Lukovica may refer to:

Municipality of Lukovica, Slovenia
Lukovica pri Domžalah, Slovenia
Lukovica pri Brezovici, Slovenia
Lukovica, Svilajnac, Serbia
Lukovica, Makedonska Kamenica, North Macedonia
Lukovica, Želino, North Macedonia